Gaius Aquillius may refer to:

Gaius Aquillius Tuscus, Roman consul in 487 BC
Gaius Aquillius Florus, Roman consul in 259 BC

Aquillii